The lesser mouse-eared bat or lesser mouse-eared myotis (Myotis blythii) is a species of insectivorous bat in the family Vespertilionidae.

Distribution
Lesser mouse-eared bats can be found in the following countries: Afghanistan, Albania, Austria, Bangladesh, Bulgaria, China, Croatia, France, Georgia, Germany, Greece, Hungary, India, Iran, Iraq, Israel, Italy, Jordan, Kazakhstan, Lebanon, Mongolia, Pakistan, Portugal, Romania, Russia, Slovenia, Spain, Switzerland, Syria, Turkmenistan, and Ukraine.

Threats
The species is decreasing in population due to the pollution and changes in land management. Construction noise has disturbed populations in southern Spain; the population in Andalusia decreased from 30,000 to 14,000 between 1994 and 2002. Herders in Syria and Turkey light fires at cave mouths for their livestock disturbing the bats.

Conservation
It is protected in most of Europe by Bonn and Berne Convention on the Conservation of European Wildlife and Natural Habitats. The species requires special measures including construction of designated areas, which are provided by Special Areas for Conservation. Natura 2000 is also protecting the species. In some European countries, the caves are closed with fences so that visitors do not disturb them.

Characteristics

References

External links
Images at www.naturlichter.de

Mouse-eared bats
Bats of Asia
Bats of Europe
Mammals described in 1857
Taxa named by Robert Fisher Tomes